Alsophis sibonius, the Dominica racer, Dominican racer,  or Antilles racer, is a species of snake endemic to the Caribbean island of Dominica.

Description
It can reach nearly a meter in length.  It feeds on lizards and small rodents.  It rarely bites humans, but may release a foul-smelling (though harmless) cloacal secretion when disturbed.

Taxonomy
Along with Alsophis manselli from Montserrat, it was previously considered a subspecies of Alsophis antillensis.

References

Alsophis
Snakes of the Caribbean
Reptiles of Dominica
Endemic fauna of Dominica
Reptiles described in 1879
Taxa named by Edward Drinker Cope